Mahalingeshwara Temple (mentioned as Tarakeshwar temple in an old inscription found inside the temple belonging to the reign of Ratta Kartaveerya III, dating back to 1153 AD) is an 11th-century Hindu temple dedicated to lord shiva. It is located at Gokak Falls, Belgaum. It has been built in Kalyani Chalukyan architectural style. It boasts of having a huge courtyard, an Ardhamandapa and a spacious open mukhamantapa(frontal courtyard) and a Garbhagriha(sanctum santorum) over which there exist a beautifully carved shrine.

References

11th-century Hindu temples